The 2017–18 season was the 138th season of competitive association football in England.

National teams

England national football team

Results and fixtures

Friendlies

2018 FIFA World Cup qualification (UEFA)

Group F

2018 FIFA World Cup

Group G

Matches

Knockout stage

England U-21 national football team

2019 UEFA European Under-21 Championship qualification

Group 4

England U-20 national football team

2017 FIFA U-20 World Cup

Group A

Round of 16

Quarter-finals

Semi-finals

Final

England U-19 national football team

2018 UEFA European Under-19 Championship qualification

Group 8

Elite round

England U-17 national football team

2017 FIFA U-17 World Cup

Group F

Round of 16

Quarter-finals

Semi-finals

Final

2018 UEFA European Under-17 Championship

The final draw was held in April 2018 in England. The 16 teams were drawn into four groups of four teams. Hosts England were assigned to position A1 in the draw, while the other teams were seeded according to their results in the qualification elite round, with the seven best elite round group winners (counting all elite round results) placed in Pot 1 and drawn to positions 1 and 2 in the groups, and the remaining eight teams (the eighth-best elite round group winner and the seven elite round group runners-up) placed in Pot 2 and drawn to positions 3 and 4 in the groups.

Group A

Quarter-finals

Semi-finals

England women's national football team

Results and fixtures

Friendlies

UEFA Women's Euro 2017

Group D

2019 FIFA Women's World Cup qualification (UEFA)

2019 FIFA Women's World Cup qualification – UEFA Group 1

2018 SheBelieves Cup

Managerial changes

England women's national under-20 football team

England women's U-19 national football team

2017 UEFA Women's Under-19 Championship

Group B

Knockout stage

2018 UEFA Women's Under-19 Championship qualification

Qualifying round

Elite round

England women's U-17 national football team

2018 UEFA Women's Under-17 Championship qualification

Qualifying round

Elite round

2018 UEFA Women's Under-17 Championship

Group B

Semi-finals

3rd place

UEFA competitions

UEFA Champions League

Play-off round

Group stage

Group A

Group C

Group E

Group F

Group H

Knockout phase

Round of 16

Quarter-finals

Semi-finals

Final

UEFA Europa League

Qualifying rounds

Third qualifying round

Play-off round

Group stage

Group E

Group H

Knockout phase

Round of 32

Round of 16

Quarter-finals

Semi-finals

UEFA Super Cup

UEFA Youth League

UEFA Champions League Path

Group A

Group C

Group E

Group F

Group H

Knockout phase

For the knockout phase (round of 16 onwards), the 16 teams are drawn into a single-elimination tournament, with all ties played over one match.

Play-offs

Round of 16

Quarter-finals

Semi-finals

Finals

UEFA Women's Champions League

Knockout phase

Round of 32

Round of 16

Quarter-finals

Semi-finals

Men's football

League season

Promotion and relegation

Premier League

In what was largely a one-sided race for the title, Manchester City won the Premier League for the third time in six years, breaking records for the highest number of goals scored by one team in a league campaign and the most victories as well as gathering the most points, becoming the first top-flight team to reach the 100-point mark. This gave manager Pep Guardiola his first pieces of silverware with the club, having also won the League Cup – with perhaps the only blemishes in the season being a shock FA Cup loss at 2013 winners Wigan Athletic and a 5–1 aggregate loss to Liverpool in the Champions League quarter-finals. Finishing second were neighbours Manchester United, whose second season under José Mourinho finished with mixed success. While they improved on the previous league season and finished as runners-up in the FA Cup final, they never came close to challenging City for the title and also endured an early exit in the Champions League at the hands at Sevilla, though they did finish higher than fourth for the first time since Sir Alex Ferguson retired in 2013.

Tottenham Hotspur successfully qualified for the Champions League once again, but this proved to be their only success in the season as they failed to win their first trophy in ten years. Early woes at their temporary home of Wembley saw the London club's hopes of challenging for the title diminish once again, with a loss of late form and fitness costing striker Harry Kane a third successive Golden Boot. A run of only three wins from their opening nine league matches extinguished Liverpool's hopes of ending their 28-year wait for a league title. Otherwise, their season proved to be a successful one as they ensured qualification for the Champions League once again, breaking the record for the most league seasons where they avoided defeat at Anfield, while summer signing Mohamed Salah narrowly broke the 22-year record for the most goals scored in a league season by scoring 32. However, their biggest achievement proved to be in the Champions League as they reached the final in Kiev against all odds, only narrowly losing to Real Madrid.

Chelsea endured what proved to be a poor defence of their title and finished fifth, missing out on the Champions League once again. A woeful start to 2018 costing them a place in the top four despite four wins in their last six games (and making it the third season in a row where the defending champions failed to finish in the top four) and winning their first FA Cup since 2012. Arsenal were unable to send manager Arsène Wenger, who resigned after 22 years as manager, out on a high as they finished in their lowest league position under the Frenchman and missed out on trophies, most notably being knocked out of the Europa League in the semi-finals. Burnley proved to be the surprise package of the whole season as they mounted a charge for Champions League qualification and stood fifth at Christmas. While 11 matches without a win saw them slide out of the top five, the Clarets recovered enough to secure seventh place and qualify for the Europa League. Everton and Leicester City looked set to battle relegation after poor starts to the season, but they rallied after the respective appointments of Sam Allardyce and Claude Puel, only missing out on the Europa League late on in the season.

For only the third time in Premier League history, all three promoted teams avoided the drop. Newcastle United finished highest, a final day win against Chelsea earning them a tenth-place finish after a poor run of form. Brighton & Hove Albion's first top-flight campaign since 1983 saw the Seagulls finish below them, never being seriously threatened with immediate relegation despite a few scares. However, arguably the biggest surprise of the three were Huddersfield Town, who defied all expectations and ensured Premier League survival in their first season in the top-flight for 45 years. While a dreadful goal-scoring record (having scored less than both Salah and Kane) and heavy losses both home and away threatened their hopes, key points gained at crucial stages helped push the Terriers away from the drop and towards safety in their penultimate match, a remarkable effort that earned the team and their American head coach David Wagner plenty of praise.

Despite making the worst start in the history of English football, going into the October international break goalless and pointless after seven games, a resurgence under former England manager Roy Hodgson saw Crystal Palace extend their stay in the top-flight to a sixth successive season – steering well clear of relegation in the process. While successfully ensuring a fourth consecutive season in the Premier League, Watford endured what proved to be another season of struggle. They did make a superb start, but their form spectacularly collapsed following what the club considered to be an "unwarranted approach" from Everton over head coach Marco Silva. The Hornets eventually pulled themselves over the finish line after a change of manager, but at the cost of question marks over the club's managerial turnover and their stability in the top-flight.

West Bromwich Albion finished bottom, ending a run of eight years among the elite – a 20-game winless run from mid-August to January, and only winning just once after that left them rooted to last place, but a late run of form under caretaker manager Darren Moore that saw the Baggies take 11 points from their last six matches at least saw them go down fighting, with relegation not being confirmed until the penultimate round of games. Stoke City finished just above them, bringing to an end a decade in the Premier League. The Potters''' downfall ultimately proved to be both an anaemic goal record and an inability to see out a win, having dropped 19 points from winning positions all season and only finishing above West Brom with a final-day win. The final spot was taken by Swansea City, who endured their worst season since promotion in 2011. The Swans appeared to have been rejuvenated by the arrival of Portuguese manager Carlos Carvalhal after Christmas, but a loss of form in their last ten matches saw the Welsh club overtaken by FA Cup semi-finalists Southampton, who endured a horrendous league season but stayed up thanks in part to the late appointment of Mark Hughes.

Championship

Following successive seasons of struggle and near-misses with relegation, Wolverhampton Wanderers ended their six-year absence from the Premier League in style, leading the table from Halloween onwards and giving Portuguese head coach Nuno Espírito Santo both promotion and the Championship title in his first season in charge. The fight for second place went down to the last round of games, but it was ultimately Cardiff City who emerged victorious and returned to the top-flight for the first time since 2014, earning manager Neil Warnock a record eighth promotion, as his mixed team of young players and journeymen ensured a Welsh presence in the top-flight next season. Taking the final spot through the playoffs were Fulham, who had been relegated to the second-tier alongside Cardiff in 2014, as they defeated Aston Villa in the playoff final at Wembley, their first visit to the stadium since 1975. This gave Serbian manager Slaviša Jokanović his second promotion to the Premier League in four seasons, having previously won promotion with Watford (albeit leaving the Hornets just weeks later) in 2015.

While a poor run of form in both December and the end of April ended their hopes of a second successive promotion, Sheffield United's first season in the second tier since 2011 proved to be an excellent one as they remained in the promotion chase for practically the entire season. Leeds United spent the first half of the season looking to build on their play-offs near-miss the previous year, but an appalling second half of the season - only bottom-placed Sunderland earned fewer points after Christmas - saw them crash down the table, with only their strong early form and a couple of late wins keeping them from being involved in the relegation struggle. Both Reading and Sheffield Wednesday endured tough seasons after narrowly missing out on promotion the previous year, with only a change of manager for the two teams helping them avoid the drop into League One. Amid off-pitch struggles and growing anger towards owner Assem Allam, a fine second half of the campaign helped Hull City avoid a second successive relegation in a season awash with 140 goals, where they massively leaked goals but had no problem scoring them either – managing to score more than second-placed Cardiff City in the process.

At the bottom of the table, Sunderland endured a second successive relegation and fell into the third tier for the first time in 30 years with just seven wins all season and an inability to turn any one of their staggering 16 draws into wins contributing to their downfall, despite the managerial presence of former Wales manager Chris Coleman. In a battle that went down to the closing minutes of the season, the remaining relegation spots were filled by Burton Albion and Barnsley, who both returned to League One after two seasons in the second tier. Despite the Brewers securing three wins from their final four matches and the Tykes actually starting their final match at Derby County outside the bottom three. This was mainly because of the heroics of Bolton Wanderers, who scored two late goals in two minutes to survive and relegate their fellow strugglers, a remarkable achievement considering their failure to win any of their first 11 matches after promotion the previous season.

League One

For the second time in three years, Wigan Athletic won the League One title and returned to the Championship at the first attempt in style, having never looked like falling out of the top two all season and breaking their previous points total from 2016. Also achieving promotion were Blackburn Rovers, who finally enjoyed some success after two relegations in five years as they also made an immediate return to the Championship. In a tightly contested play-off final that went all the way to extra time, Rotherham United scraped past Shrewsbury Town to make it a hat-trick of immediate returns to the second tier – in almost exactly the same fashion they had won promotion to the second tier four years previously. This meant that for the first time ever since three clubs were allowed promotion in 1974, all three clubs relegated from the Championship the previous season were promoted the following season.

Portsmouth continued their gradual climb back up the Football League by achieving a top-half finish, never being remotely threatened by an immediate relegation back to League Two. While they narrowly missed out on a second promotion in a row with only one win in their final six games, the signs were promising for the South-Coast club in their first season of ownership under former Walt Disney executive Michael Eisner. AFC Wimbledon, despite remaining in a relegation battle all season long and having won just five games between August and December, were able to secure a third successive season in the third tier – and also finished above rivals Milton Keynes Dons for the first time in their history, while also ensuring that the following season they would be playing in a higher division than the Dons for the first time.

Three years after gaining promotion to League One, Bury finally ran out of luck and were the first team in the division to suffer relegation, winning just eight times. Having been tipped to regain the form that saw them enter the Championship three years previously, Milton Keynes Dons ultimately fared little better and fell into the bottom tier for the first time in a decade, changing managers three times and finishing well below rivals AFC Wimbledon as a result. Just two years after winning promotion to League One, Northampton Town's struggles continued as they fell back into the bottom tier of the Football League, with the worst defence in the division playing a big role. Taking the last spot in the last game were Oldham Athletic, who finally succumbed to the relegation they had been fighting against for the last couple of years, and fell into the bottom tier of the Football League for the first time in 47 years, also making this the first time since 1997 that they would be playing in anything other than the third tier. Both teams went down playing each other (and drawing 2–2), with Rochdale surviving by a single point.

League Two

Just 12 years after returning to the Football League, Accrington Stanley won promotion to the third tier for the first time in their history (their forerunners having last played in the third tier in 1960), an outstanding second half of the season propelling them from mid-table to the title – and securing promotion on the 130th anniversary of the Lancashire club's founding. Also going up were Luton Town, whose steady climb back up the Football League saw them return to League One for the first time in a decade; while a loss of form cost them the title having led the table for large periods of the season, the club saved some grace by being the highest-scoring team in the division. Taking the third automatic promotion spot in what proved to be a tight race were Wycombe Wanderers, who ended their six-year stay in League Two and finally gave manager Gareth Ainsworth the promotion he had sought after years of heart-break. The final promotion spot via the play-offs was filled by Coventry City, who secured an immediate return to League One in a season that saw them finish in the top six for the first time since 1970 and end a 51-year wait to achieve promotion - at the expense of Exeter City, the club losing in the play-off final for the second season running.

Notts County enjoyed what proved to be their most successful season since winning promotion to League One in 2010 as they remained in the promotion race for the whole season, only missing out on a place in the play-off final after a controversial loss to Coventry City; furthermore, player-manager Kevin Nolan became the first Magpies manager to last a full season in charge for nine years. Lincoln City's first season back in the Football League since 2011 proved to be very successful as they not only attempted a second consecutive promotion by qualifying for the play-offs (losing to Exeter City), but they also won the Football League Trophy – beating Shrewsbury Town on their first ever visit to Wembley. A sharp downturn in form that saw them fail to win for 21 games resulted in Grimsby Town having to battle to keep their place in League Two, with only four late wins towards the end of the season helping them stay up. Having been tipped for immediate relegation, Forest Green Rovers achieved survival in their first ever season in the Football League – while a few heavy losses in the opening months left them stuck in the relegation zone, several bursts of good form at key stages in the season helped them up the table and secure their place in the closing weeks.

After 97 years as a member of the Football League, Chesterfield's sharp decline in form continued as they endured a second successive relegation, just 4 years after winning promotion to League One; while a good run of form in the winter months gave the club hope, a poor start and an equally poor end to the season cost them their League status. Taking the second spot and enduring their second relegation from League Two in five years were Barnet, despite the return of Martin Allen for the fifth time as manager late in the season; while the club did put up more of a fight to avoid the drop, ending their season only relegated on goal difference, it once again proved to be too late. This made Barnet the first club to be automatically relegated from the Football League on three separate occasions, and the club to have survived the shortest after being promoted from the Conference (not counting Maidstone United, who also lasted just three seasons after promotion, but were forced out of the Football League by bankruptcy rather than being relegated). Morecambe narrowly escaped relegation on goal difference, despite having the weakest goal-scoring record in the division and winning less games than both relegated clubs, while Port Vale avoided a second successive relegation despite winning just twice at the turn of the year.

National League Top Division

Macclesfield Town were National League champions and won promotion back to League Two after a six-year absence from the Football League. Taking the second promotion spot in the first season to use six play-off places instead of four were Tranmere Rovers, who made amends for their previous play-off final loss the previous year and returned to the Football League after three years, in a tightly contested final with Boreham Wood.

Leyton Orient and Hartlepool were the two teams relegated from the Football League the previous season, and neither achieved particular success, finishing 13th and 15th in the league respectively. Through much of the season, both looked more likely to be relegated again than to challenge for promotion and Hartlepool also endured struggles off the field, nearly going out of business altogether.

Relegated from the league were Guiseley, Chester, Torquay United and Woking. Guiseley finished bottom of the table, picking up just seven wins and conceding the most goals in the league, seeing them relegated back to the National League North three years after being promoted. Chester and Torquay United both suffered financial uncertainty in addition to being relegated, the latter just a few years after having been in the Football League. Woking's relegation was not guaranteed until the final day of the season, when a defeat against Dover ensured they finished one point behind Barrow.

League play-offs

Football League play-offs

EFL Championship

Final

EFL League One

Final

EFL League Two

Final

National League play-offs

National League

Final

National League North

Final

National League South

Final

Cup competitions

FA Cup

Final

EFL Cup

Final

Community Shield

EFL Trophy

Final

FA Trophy

Final

Women's football
League season

Women's Super League

WSL 1

WSL 2

Cup competitions

FA Women's Cup

Final

FA WSL Cup

Final

Managerial changes
This is a list of changes of managers within English league football:

Diary of the season
 5 June: Northern Premier League members Ilkeston are wound-up at the High Court in Liverpool.
 16 June: The live-streamed first-round draw for the 2017–18 EFL Cup, held in sponsor Carabao's hometown of Bangkok in Thailand, descends into farce as a string of errors crop up, including an official graphic assigning two different sets of opposition to Charlton Athletic.
 7 July: The draw for the extra qualifying round of the FA Cup pits Northwich Victoria with the club that acrimoniously broke away from them, 1874 Northwich.
 20 July: Following the demise of East Midlands side Ilkeston, a new club, Ilkeston Town, are founded, led by Notts County owner Alan Hardy. The club is the third to take the name, after sides active from the 1880s to 1903, and from 1945 to 2010.
 27 July: Leighton Baines scores the only goal in Everton's first-leg tie with MFK Ružomberok in the UEFA Europa League's third qualifying round as Wayne Rooney makes his second debut for the Toffees.
 31 July: The English Football League announce that, on a trial basis for this season, penalty shoot-outs in the EFL Cup, EFL Trophy and the play-offs will be in a format more akin to the "tiebreak in tennis" in which team A kicks first and team B kicks second. This is referred to as "ABBA".
 3 August: Everton eliminate Ružomberok 2–0 on aggregate; Dominic Calvert-Lewin is the goalscorer in Slovakia.
 4 August: Two matches start off the English Football League: Bradley Johnson of Derby County scores the first goal of the 2017–18 English Football League season at Sunderland, who hit back through a penalty kick converted by Lewis Grabban, while Nottingham Forest become the campaign's first victors, winning 1–0 over Millwall through debutant Barrie McKay to go top of the embryonic EFL Championship table. Meanwhile, on Merseyside, Everton and Liverpool learn their opposition in the European playoff draws: the latter are paired with German outfit 1899 Hoffenheim in the UEFA Champions League, while the former face Croat club Hajduk Split in the Europa League.
 6 August: Arsenal are victorious over Chelsea in the 2017 FA Community Shield after earning a 1–1 draw with a goal near the end of normal time. The match subsequently becomes the first competitive game to be decided via the use of the new "ABBA" penalty format, with consecutive misses by Thibaut Courtois and Álvaro Morata ultimately proving costly for Chelsea, and Arsenal scoring all four of their own penalties.
 23 August: Liverpool's 6–3 aggregate victory over 1899 Hoffenheim sees them enter the group stage of this season's Champions League. This means that, for the first time, five English teams will be taking part in the group stage of the competition (five had previously qualified for the 2005–06 tournament, but Everton failed to make it through to the group stages).
 31 August: The first month of the season ends with Manchester United leading the Premier League, having won all three matches so far and scored ten goals without having conceded once. Liverpool are in second place, with third-placed Huddersfield Town proving the surprise package of the early season, level on points with both Liverpool and fourth-placed Manchester City. West Bromwich Albion are behind the aforementioned three sides on goal difference, while defending champions Chelsea are sixth. West Ham United, Crystal Palace and AFC Bournemouth are all without any points (and in Crystal Palace's case, goals) so far this season, and make up the bottom three. In the Championship, Cardiff City lead the way with five wins out of five; Ipswich Town are in second place, a point ahead of Leeds United, with Wolverhampton Wanderers, newly promoted Sheffield United and Nottingham Forest rounding off the top six. Bolton Wanderers are bottom of the table, with Brentford ahead only on goal difference, and both sides winless. Norwich City, who had been among the pre-season promotion favourites, are also in the bottom three.
 30 September: The month ends with Manchester City having taken over the top of the Premier League table from their cross-city rivals United; both sides have near-identical records, with six wins and a draw apiece, but City are ahead by just one goal. Tottenham Hotspur are five points back in third place, and Chelsea are fourth; Watford are now just a point off fourth place, though they have played a game more than Liverpool (6th) and Arsenal (7th). Crystal Palace are marooned at the bottom of the table following a horrendous start to the season, which has seen them lose seven games out of seven without scoring once, a top-flight record. Bournemouth are still in the bottom three as well, with Swansea City now having joined them. Cardiff City continue to lead the way in the Championship, with Wolverhampton Wanderers now second. Sheffield United are third and hunting for a second successive promotion, though fourth-place Leeds United have a game in hand over their Yorkshire rivals. Bristol City and Preston North End occupy the other two play-off spots. Bolton Wanderers remain bottom, and are now five points adrift. Sunderland are now second-bottom and facing a battle to avoid a second relegation in a row, while Birmingham City have also dropped into the bottom three.
 5 October: The England national team secure qualification for the 2018 FIFA World Cup, with a 1–0 victory over Slovenia at Wembley Stadium. While Scotland's victory over Slovakia on the same night meant that it would have been sufficient for England to draw, an injury time goal from Harry Kane ultimately puts qualification beyond all doubt.
 31 October: October comes to a close with Manchester City opening a five-point lead over second-placed Manchester United with the best start to a season in Premier League history: with 10 games played, they have scored 35 goals while only conceding 6 and have only dropped two points. Spurs and Chelsea remain third and fourth, Arsenal have jumped ahead of Liverpool to stand in fifth, and Burnley have continued their good start to the season to climb to seventh. Crystal Palace have finally won a game but remain bottom. Bournemouth remain 19th, and Everton have fallen into the relegation zone, with Swansea only ahead on goal difference. Wolves and Cardiff have swapped places at the summit of the Championship, while Sheffield United remain third. The rest of the top six consists of Bristol City, Derby County (with a game in hand), and Leeds (ahead of Middlesbrough on goals scored). Bolton (24th) and Sunderland remain in the bottom three, now sandwiching Burton Albion.
 10 November: England draw 0–0 with reigning world champions Germany in a friendly at Wembley.
 14 November: England register another home clean sheet, this time shutting out five-time FIFA World Cup winners Brazil in a goalless draw at the national stadium.
 30 November: Manchester City end November still at the top of the table, having won all their league games in November. Their lead over second-placed Manchester United has increased to eight points; furthermore, City will break the record for the most Premier League games won consecutively if they win their upcoming match against West Ham and succeed in the Manchester derby. Chelsea climb to third and Arsenal seize fourth place, with Liverpool two points behind them. Burnley's good form shows no sign of abating as they finish November in sixth place, ahead of a Spurs side whose European exploits are outstripping their domestic performance. Crystal Palace end another month bottom, but now tied on goal difference with Swansea City and only three points behind West Bromwich Albion. West Ham United are 18th. The top three of the Championship stays the same from the end of October. Aston Villa have leapfrogged the rest of the play-off hopefuls and stand fourth, ahead of Bristol City and Derby. Sunderland and Bolton have swapped positions, but the relegation zone otherwise remains unchanged.
 1 December: The World Cup draw is made at the Kremlin State Palace in Moscow, Russia, co-hosted by the Golden Boot winner for the 1986 tournament, Gary Lineker. England are drawn in Group G, against Belgium, Tunisia, and Panama.
 2 December: In the second round of the FA Cup, Southern League Premier Division side Hereford force a replay with League One outfit Fleetwood Town, while a 95th-minute winner for Notts County deprives Oxford City of the National League South a place in the third-round draw.
 3 December: Manchester United win 3–1 against rivals Arsenal. Antonio Valencia got the first of the victors' goals before Jesse Lingard scored his second and third of the week, however Paul Pogba was sent off and will be suspended for the forthcoming Manchester derby; Alexandre Lacazette is the Gunners' goalscorer. In more FA Cup round two fixtures, Crewe Alexandra and Woking earn replays against opposition from higher leagues: Alex after Blackburn Rovers went 3–0 up and then Rovers were reduced to nine men, and the non-league club after falling behind to Peterborough United.
 4 December: The FA Cup third-round draw throws up the Tees–Wear and Merseyside derbies as well as the Brighton–Crystal Palace rivalry, while also setting up an all-London tie between Tottenham and AFC Wimbledon. Holders Arsenal travel to Nottingham Forest, Manchester United are at home to Derby, and Milton Keynes Dons are drawn away at Queens Park Rangers, who were offered the Stadium mk site that would later house the Dons.
 7 December: It is announced that the FA Cup tie between Brighton & Hove Albion and Crystal Palace will see the English competitive club début of video assistant referee technology.
 11 December: The European draws are made. In the Champions League last 16, Chelsea will face Barcelona, Liverpool drew Porto, Manchester City will play Swiss side Basel, Manchester United meet Sevilla and Tottenham will welcome Juventus back to Wembley after facing the reigning Italian champions there in pre-season. England's sole Europa League survivors, Arsenal, will face Östersund of Sweden, managed by Englishman Graham Potter. Elsewhere, Liverpool's Mohamed Salah is crowned BBC African Footballer of the Year for 2017, ahead of Chelsea man Victor Moses and Naby Keïta, the Leipzig Red Bull due to join Salah at Liverpool on 1 July 2018.
 14 December: The last non-league club exit the FA Cup as Fleetwood Town beat Hereford in the second round replay. This is the first tournament since the 1950–51 edition to see no non-league side reach the third round.
 20 December: Bristol City are the shock name in the EFL Cup semi-finals after victory against holders Manchester United. They will face Manchester City in the last four, while rivals Arsenal and Chelsea are drawn together and will meet in a third competition this season, having played each other in the Premier League and the FA Community Shield.
 23 December: Harry Kane equals Alan Shearer's record of 36 Premier League goals in a calendar year, scoring all of Tottenham's three in their away win at Burnley.
 26 December: Kane surpasses Shearer's record  with another hat-trick in the 5–2 home win against Southampton, ending the year with 39 Premier League goals.
 31 December: Manchester City end 2017 by ending their 18-game winning streak with a goalless draw at Crystal Palace, but are now 14 points ahead of second-placed Chelsea, and it is increasingly becoming a question of not if but when the Mancunian side will claim their first title since 2014. A poor December has seen Manchester United fall to third, three points ahead of Liverpool. Arsenal and Spurs remain in the hunt for Champions League football, and Burnley remain poised to finish in the top seven. Crystal Palace have escaped the relegation zone and finish the year in 17th, though 18th-placed West Ham are a point behind with a game in hand. Swansea, who held the dubious honour of being bottom of the league on Christmas Day, hold their position into the New Year, tied on goal difference with West Brom. In the Championship, another dominant side is emerging, as Wolves are 10 points clear of second-placed Derby County. Severnside rivals Bristol City and Cardiff continue to compete for second place. Leeds have returned to the play-off zone, and Sheffield United steal sixth place from Aston Villa on goals scored. Sunderland have escaped the relegation zone at the expense of 24th-placed Birmingham City. Bolton and Burton are 22nd and 23rd, but Hull City and Barnsley are only a few points ahead of the two sides and also in danger of relegation.
 2 January: Preston North End and Ireland U21 defender Kevin O'Connor is revealed as the winner of €1,000,000 in the Irish National Lottery's 2017 Christmas Millionaire Raffle, with a ticket bought as a Christmas present by his uncle. Elsewhere, West Brom's winless run is extended to 20 matches with defeat at the London Stadium: Jake Livermore and a West Ham fan rowed after the supporter made reference to the death of Livermore's young son.
 4 January: Mohamed Salah adds the CAF African Footballer of the Year award for 2017 to his collection, ahead of fellow Kopite Sadio Mané.
 6 January: The third round of the FA Cup sees Premier League side Stoke City dumped out by League Two outfit Coventry City, a result which costs Stoke manager Mark Hughes his job within hours of the game.
 7 January: The next round of FA Cup fixtures results in holders Arsenal being knocked out by Championship side Nottingham Forest, while another Championship side, Leeds United, are knocked out by League Two side Newport County.
 14 January: During the first set of Premier League fixtures since the enforced FA Cup break, Manchester City see their unbeaten run come to an end in thrilling fashion after going down 4–3 at Liverpool. Alex Oxlade-Chamberlain opened the scoring for the Reds on 9 minutes before goals from Roberto Firmino, Sadio Mané and Mohamed Salah sealed the deal.
 17 January: League 1 leaders Wigan Athletic eliminate Premier League team Bournemouth in the FA Cup third round replay at the DW Stadium. Meanwhile, at Stamford Bridge, Norwich take Chelsea to a penalty shoot-out before exiting the Cup, as the Premier League winners score all five of their spot-kicks.
 23 January: Bristol City's EFL Cup run is ended at the semi-final stage by quadruple-chasing Manchester City.
 24 January: Arsenal beat Chelsea 2–1 in the EFL Cup semi-final. The draw for the inaugural edition of the UEFA Nations League is made: England are drawn into Group 4 of League A, alongside Spain and Croatia. Elsewhere, Leeds' new crest for their centenary is unveiled and promptly receives a barrage of criticism with some likening the "Leeds Salute" depiction to the cover art of Pro Evolution Soccer 2; managing director Angus Kinnear says "We need to reopen that consultation process very clearly."
 31 January: Manchester City's seeming march towards the title is showing no signs of slowing, with the club now having a 15-point lead. Neighbours Manchester United have now moved up to second place, three points ahead of Liverpool, who are ahead of Chelsea on goal difference. Tottenham Hotspur are two more points behind in fifth place, but have a comfortable six-point lead over North London rivals Arsenal. Burnley remain seventh, though with resurgent Leicester City and Everton sides closing the gap. Despite winning for the first time since August, West Bromwich Albion have now fallen to the foot of the table, three points behind both Swansea and Southampton, the latter of whom have been dropped into the relegation zone after failing to win a league game since the end of November. The situation in the Championship is looking a similar procession for the leaders, with Wolverhampton Wanderers now 11 points ahead of Derby County, who in turn are just barely ahead of the chasing pack, with Aston Villa, Cardiff City, Bristol City and Fulham making up the top six. Burton are now bottom of the table, with Sunderland now back in the relegation zone, along with Bolton; only four points separate the bottom six, however.
 6 February: The 60th anniversary of the Munich air disaster is marked with remembrance ceremonies at Old Trafford and on Manchester Platz (Manchester Square) in Munich, while Manchester United's Under-19 team visited Partizan Stadium, where United played the match before the air disaster. In the FA Cup fourth round replays, Rochdale of League One knock out Championship side Millwall, Huddersfield overcome Birmingham City in extra time, and Notts' run is ended in South Wales as Swansea City engineer eight goals at the Liberty Stadium. Meanwhile, Lincoln City will play at Wembley for the first time after beating Chelsea's Under-21 team, the last remaining U21 side, in the EFL Trophy semi-final.
 13 February: The 2017–18 UEFA Champions League knockout phase begins at St. Jakob-Park, where Manchester City's fight on four fronts continues as they hit Basel for four. At Juventus Stadium, Gonzalo Higuaín's nine-minute brace is overturned by Tottenham: Harry Kane halved the arrears before Higuaín missed the chance to complete a hat-trick by missing a penalty; Christian Eriksen drew Spurs level with a free-kick.
 14 February: Liverpool inflict a Valentine's Day massacre on Porto as Sadio Mané scores a hat-trick at the Estádio do Dragão; Mo Salah and Bobby Firmino are the other scorers for Jürgen Klopp's Kopites.
 15 February: Arsenal score three away goals without reply against Östersund at the Jamtkraft Arena in the first leg of their Europa League round of 32 clash.
 16 February: Bottom-of-the-table West Bromwich Albion are rocked after four senior players, all capped by their countries, are investigated for stealing a taxicab on a club trip to Barcelona. They are American-born Wales goalkeeper Boaz Myhill, England midfielders Gareth Barry and Jake Livermore, and Jonny Evans, the captain of his club and his country of Northern Ireland.
 18 February: League One's bottom club Rochdale draw 2–2 with Spurs in the FA Cup fifth round, setting up a replay at Wembley. In the Championship, Luke Chambers and Timm Klose exchange late headed goals as the East Anglian derby finishes 1–1.
 19 February: Wigan's Will Grigg sets fire to Manchester City's quadruple hopes by scoring the only goal of a bad-tempered all-Greater Manchester fifth round Cup-tie, becoming only the third side this season to beat City in all competitions.
 20 February: Willian gives Chelsea the lead over Barça in the Champions League, only for Lionel Messi to finally break his duck against Chelsea at the ninth time of asking, firing in the 75th minute at Stamford Bridge.
 21 February: A David de Gea masterclass between the Ramón Sánchez Pizjuán Stadium sticks helps Manchester United shut out Sevilla in a goalless draw in Andalusia.
 22 February: Arsenal squeeze past Östersund on aggregate after the Swedish side win on the night but fall short on aggregate.
 23 February: The Europa League round of 16 draw pits Arsenal, now Britain's last Europa League representative after Celtic's last-32 exit, with Milan, a fixture that was last played when the Rossoneri eliminated the Londoners from the same stage of the 2011–12 UEFA Champions League.
 25 February: Manchester City win 3–0 over Arsenal in the 2018 EFL Cup Final: Sergio Agüero, Vincent Kompany, and David Silva are on the scoresheet.
 6 March: A goalless draw at Anfield is enough to see Liverpool comfortably past Porto and through to the quarter-finals of the Champions League.
 7 March: Having gone in front through Son Heung-min, Juventus negate and overturn Tottenham's lead in three minutes to end their Champions League hopes at the national stadium. Elsewhere in the capital, senior officials on the West Ham board, including vice-chair Karren Brady, are accused by The Independent of meeting with members of the Inter City Firm, an English hooligan firm aligned with the Stratford side. Meanwhile, Basel become only the second side to win at the City of Manchester Stadium in the Pep Guardiola era by beating Manchester City 2–1 on the night, bowing out 5–2 on aggregate.
 10 March: A match at the London Stadium between West Ham and Burnley designated for remembering Bobby Moore on the 25th anniversary of his death descends into ugly scenes as during four separate pitch invasions, "an impromptu protest took place within the stadium with around 200 people gathering under the directors' box" according to the Metropolitan Police.
 13 March: Wissam Ben Yedder's four-minute double for Sevilla proves insurmountable for Manchester United, who can only find a Romelu Lukaku goal in riposte.
 14 March: Barcelona talisman Lionel Messi chalks up his 99th and 100th Champions League goals either side of Ousmane Dembélé's first in Blaugrana'' colours to send Chelsea out of the Champions League.
 15 March: The England squad for the friendlies against the Netherlands and Italy includes uncapped Bournemouth man Lewis Cook, Swansea City's Alfie Mawson, and Burnley's defensive duo James Tarkowski and Nick Pope. The 27-man cohort also shows recalls for Jack Wilshere and Ashley Young. Also included is Danny Welbeck, on the same day he scored two of Arsenal's three in their win over Milan. Granit Xhaka got the Gunners' other goal.
 16 March: England are guaranteed one side in the Champions League semi-finals after the last surviving English teams, North Western clubs Liverpool and Manchester City, are drawn together. The match will be the first all-England tie in the Champions League since 2010–11, and City will become the seventh English side to draw Liverpool in Europe. In the Europa League, Arsenal's reward for overcoming Milan is a trip to Russia, three months before England fly over, to do battle with CSKA Moscow.
 13 April: The European semi-final draws are made: Liverpool will face Roma in the Champions League to set up a rerun of the 1984 European Cup Final and a return to the Stadio Olimpico where Liverpool won the 1977 European Cup Final; Europa League Arsenal are paired with 2009–10 and 2011–12 UEFA Europa League champions Atlético Madrid.
 24 April: Following a summer move to Liverpool, Mohamed Salah scores two of the Reds' five at Anfield and sinks his former club in the first leg of the Champions League semi-final, allowing them to take a three-goal lead to Italy. In domestic affairs, Chesterfield are relegated and lose their League status for the first time since 1921, although the club's official Twitter account ignores this, electing instead to focus on their Derbyshire Senior Cup victory that same day.
 1 May: Mo Salah beats Kevin De Bruyne to the 2017–18 FWA Footballer of the Year award, in what Football Writers' Association chair Patrick Barclay decreed "the toughest call since 1968–69", when the accolade was shared. The other nominees were: Sergio Agüero, Christian Eriksen, Roberto Firmino, Nick Pope, David Silva, Raheem Sterling, and Jan Vertonghen.
 2 May: A 4–2 defeat in the second leg is enough for Liverpool to overcome Roma 7–6 on aggregate and set up a final date with the most successful club in the tournament's history: twelve-time winners Real Madrid.
 5 May: Stoke's ten-year tenure in the top-flight will come to an end this season, after a 2–1 defeat to Crystal Palace renders the Potters' relegation unavoidable.
 9 May: Tottenham Hotspur's victory against Newcastle means Spurs will qualify for the 2018–19 UEFA Champions League and finish as the highest-placed London club.
 15 May: England World Cup winner Ray Wilson dies at the age of 83 after a long battle with Alzheimer's disease and on the same morning former Aston Villa and Bolton defender Jlloyd Samuel is tragically killed in a car accident in Cheshire having dropped his children off at school.
 19 May: Chelsea beat Manchester United in the FA Cup final.
 26 May: A Gareth Bale wonder goal seals Real Madrid's 3rd Champions League in a row.

Clubs removed
 Dorking F.C. were dissolved after competing in the 2016–17 Combined Counties Football League 1st Division (level 10).
 Ilkeston F.C. were wound up after being relegated from the 2016–17 Northern Premier League Premier Division (level 7).

New clubs
 Ilkeston Town F.C. join the 2017–18 Midland Football League Division One.

Deaths
 1 June 2017: Ernie Ackerley, 73, Barrow forward.
 2 June 2017: Tony Potrac, 64, Chelsea winger.
 2 June 2017: Ralph Wetton, 89, Tottenham Hotspur, Plymouth Argyle and Aldershot wing half.
 5 June 2017: Cheick Tioté, 30, Ivory Coast and Newcastle United midfielder.
 18 June 2017: Albert Franks, 81, Newcastle United and Lincoln City wing half.
 21 June 2017: Ray Smith, 88, Luton Town and Southend United wing-half.
 26 June 2017: John Groves, 83, Luton Town wing-half.
 June 2017: Des Collins, 94, Chesterfield, Halifax Town, Carlisle United, Barrow, Bournemouth & Boscombe Athletic, Shrewsbury Town and Accrington Stanley winger.
 June 2017: John Higgins, 87, Swindon Town defender.
 June 2017: Matt Crowe, 84, Norwich City and Brentford wing-half.
 June 2017: Peter Bircumshaw, 78, Notts County, Bradford City and Stockport County forward.
 2 July 2017: John McCormick, 80, Crystal Palace centre back.
 5 July 2017: John McKenzie, 91, Scotland and Bournemouth & Boscombe Athletic outside right.
 c.5 July 2017: Ray Chadwick, 82, referee.
 7 July 2017: Tony Moore, 69, Chesterfield and Chester winger.
 c.7 July 2017: Ken Wimshurst, 79, Gateshead, Southampton and Bristol City right-half.
 15 July 2017: Davie Laing, 92, Gillingham wing half.
 26 July 2017: Jimmy White, 75, Bournemouth & Boscombe Athletic, Portsmouth, Gillingham and Cambridge United centre half.
 7 July 2017: Ray Barnard, 84, Middlesbrough and Lincoln City full back.
 2 August 2017: Dave Caldwell, 85, Rotherham United left back.
 8 August 2017: Mike Deakin, 83, Crystal Palace, Northampton Town and Aldershot forward.
 10 August 2017: Alec Eisenträger, 90, Bristol City inside forward.
 21 August 2017: Bill Green, 66, Hartlepool United, Carlisle United, West Ham United, Peterborough United, Chesterfield and Doncaster Rovers centre half, who also managed Scunthorpe United and was a prominent scout for many clubs.
 24 August 2017: Alan Boswell, 74, Walsall, Shrewsbury Town, Wolverhampton Wanderers, Bolton Wanderers and Port Vale goalkeeper.
 13 September 2017: Derek Wilkinson, 82, Sheffield Wednesday winger.
 22 September 2017: John Worsdale, 68, Stoke City and Lincoln City winger.
 3 October 2017: Les Mutrie, 66, Carlisle United, Hull City, Colchester United and Hartlepool United striker.
 6 October 2017: Ian McNeill, 85, Leicester City, Brighton & Hove Albion and Southend United inside forward, who also managed Wigan Athletic and Shrewsbury Town.
 9 October 2017: Jimmy Reid, 81, Bury and Stockport County inside forward.
 11 October 2017: Dick Hewitt, 74, Bradford City, Barnsley and York City midfielder.
 19 October 2017: Brian Riley, 80, Bolton Wanderers winger
 c. 27 October 2017: Andy Reid, 55, Bury defender.
 5 November 2017: Dionatan Teixeira, 25, Fleetwood Town and Stoke City defender.
 23 November 2017: Allan Harris, 74, Chelsea, Coventry City, Queens Park Rangers, Plymouth Argyle and Cambridge United defender.
 27 November 2017: Dermot Drummy, 56, former Crawley Town manager, who also coached at Chelsea and played for Blackpool.
 November 2017: Tommy Farrer, 94, Great Britain Olympic footballer.
 3 December 2017: Ian Twitchin, 65, Torquay United midfielder.
 22 December 2017: Cyril Beavon, 80, Oxford United defender.
 26 December 2017: Willie Penman, 78, Newcastle United, Swindon Town and Walsall inside forward.
 30 December 2017: John Faulkner, 69, Leeds United and Luton Town defender.
 December 2017: Steve Piper, 64, Brighton and Hove Albion and Portsmouth defender and midfielder.
 2 January 2018: Alan Deakin, 76, Aston Villa and Walsall wing half.
 3 January 2018: Mike McCartney, 63, Carlisle United, Southampton and Plymouth Argyle full back.
 6 January 2018: Nigel Sims, 86, Wolverhampton Wanderers, Aston Villa and Peterborough United goalkeeper.
 8 January 2018: Juan Carlos Garcia, 29, Honduras and Wigan Athletic left back.
 9 January 2018: Ted Phillips, 84, Ipswich Town, Leyton Orient, Luton Town and Colchester United striker.
 9 January 2018: Tommy Lawrence, 77, Scotland, Liverpool and Tranmere Rovers goalkeeper.
 10 January 2018: John McGlashan, 50, Millwall, Peterborough United and Rotherham United midfielder.
 14 January 2018: Cyrille Regis, 59, England, West Bromwich Albion, Coventry City, Aston Villa, Wolverhampton Wanderers, Wycombe Wanderers and Chester City striker.
 16 January 2018: Rodney Fern, 69, Leicester City, Luton Town, Chesterfield and Rotherham United striker.
 22 January 2018: Jimmy Armfield, 82, England and Blackpool right back, who also went on to manage Bolton Wanderers and Leeds United.
 25 January 2018: Keith Pring, 74, Wales, Newport County, Rotherham United, Notts County and Southport winger.
 28 January 2018: Paul Alcock, 64, referee.
 30 January 2018: Vic Keeble, 87, Colchester United, Newcastle United and West Ham United forward.
 9 February 2018: Liam Miller, 36, Republic of Ireland, Manchester United, Leeds United, Sunderland, Queens Park Rangers midfielder.
 10 February 2018: Dick Scott, 76, Norwich City, Cardiff City, Scunthorpe United and Lincoln City wing half.
 22 February 2018: Billy Wilson, 71, Blackburn Rovers and Portsmouth full back.
 28 February 2018: Kieron Durkan, 44, Wrexham, Stockport County, Macclesfield Town, Rochdale and Swansea City midfielder.
 3 March 2018: Arthur Stewart, 76, Northern Ireland and Derby County wing half.
 6 March 2018: John Kurila, 76, Northampton Town, Bristol City, Southend United, Colchester United and Lincoln City wing half.
 c. 7 March 2018: John Molyneux, 72, Chester City and Liverpool right back.
 10 March 2018: Wally Gould, 79, Sheffield United, York City and Brighton & Hove Albion winger.
 13 March 2018: Ken Mulhearn, 72, Stockport County, Manchester City, Shrewsbury Town and Crewe Alexandra goalkeeper.
 March 2018: George Meek, 84, Leeds United, Leicester City and Walsall winger.
 28 March 2018: Bobby Ferguson, 80, Newcastle United, Derby County, Cardiff City and Newport County defender, who also managed Newport and Ipswich Town.
 28 March 2018: Colin Harper, 71, Ipswich Town defender who was also caretaker-manager at Port Vale.
 29 March 2018: Ron Mailer, 85, Darlington wing half.
 30 March 2018: Frank Hodgetts, 93, West Bromwich Albion and Millwall winger.
 4 April 2018: Ray Wilkins, 61, England, Chelsea, Manchester United, Queens Park Rangers, Crystal Palace, Wycombe Wanderers, Millwall and Leyton Orient midfielder, who also managed Queens Park Rangers, Fulham and Jordan.
 13 April 2018: Ron Cooper, 79, Peterborough United defender.
 16 April 2018: Rod Taylor, 74, Portsmouth, Gillingham and Bournemouth & Boscombe Athletic wing half.
 20 April 2018: Roy Bentley, 93, England, Bristol City, Newcastle United, Chelsea, Fulham and Queens Park Rangers striker, who also managed Reading and Swansea City.
 20 April 2018: Eddie Blackburn, 61, Hull City, York City and Hartlepool United goalkeeper.
 26 April 2018: Dick Bate, 71, one time Southend United manager, who had extensive coaching experience over forty years with a number of teams.
 28 April 2018: George Mulhall, 81, Scotland and Sunderland outside left, who also managed Bradford City, Bolton Wanderers and Halifax Town.
 9 May 2018: Arthur Fitzsimons, 88, Republic of Ireland, Middlesbrough, Lincoln City and Mansfield Town inside forward.
 10 May 2018: Ken Hodgkisson, 85, West Bromwich Albion and Walsall inside forward.
 10 May 2018: Graham Lovett, 70, West Bromwich Albion midfielder.
 15 May 2018: Jlloyd Samuel, 37, Trinidad & Tobago, Aston Villa and Bolton Wanderers left back.
 15 May 2018: Ray Wilson, 83, England, Huddersfield Town, Everton, Oldham Athletic and Bradford City left back, who also managed Bradford, and was part of England's FIFA World Cup winning team of 1966.
 21 May 2018: Franny Firth, 61, Huddersfield Town, Halifax Town and Bury winger.
 May 2018: Tommy McGhee, 89, Portsmouth and Reading full back.
 May 2018: Cliff Jackson, 76, Swindon Town, Crystal Palace, Plymouth Argyle and Torquay United forward.
 25 May 2018: Phil McKnight, 93, Chelsea and Leyton Orient wing half.
 28 May 2018: Neale Cooper, 54, Aston Villa and Reading midfielder, who also managed Hartlepool United and Gillingham.

Retirements

 21 June 2017: Keith Lasley, 37, former Plymouth Argyle midfielder.
 24 June 2017: Álvaro Arbeloa, 34, former Spain, Liverpool and West Ham United defender.
 28 June 2017: Scott Parker, 36, former England, Charlton Athletic, Chelsea, Newcastle United, West Ham United, Tottenham Hotspur and Fulham midfielder.
 29 June 2017: Craig King, 20, former Luton Town goalkeeper.
 July 2017: Royston Drenthe, 30, former Netherlands, Everton, Reading and Sheffield Wednesday winger.
3 July 2017: Richie Wellens, 37, former Manchester United, Blackpool, Oldham Athletic, Doncaster Rovers and Leicester City midfielder.
 7 July 2017: Kevin McNaughton, 34, former Scotland, Cardiff City and Wigan Athletic right back.
 17 July 2017: Paul Robinson, 37, former England, Leeds United, Tottenham Hotspur, Blackburn Rovers and Burnley goalkeeper.
 24 July 2017: Thomas Sørensen, 41, former Denmark, Sunderland, Aston Villa and Stoke City goalkeeper.
 25 July 2017: Michu, 31, former Spain and Swansea City striker.
 8 August 2017: Mark Hudson, 35, former Crystal Palace, Charlton Athletic, Cardiff City and Huddersfield Town defender.
 9 August 2017: Jermaine Easter, 35, former Wales, Hartlepool United, Cambridge United, Boston United, Stockport County, Wycombe Wanderers, Plymouth Argyle, Milton Keynes Dons, Crystal Palace, Millwall and Bristol Rovers forward.
 14 August 2017: Stephen McManus, 34, former Scotland and Middlesbrough centre half.
 18 August 2017: Víctor Valdés, 35, former Spain, Manchester United and Middlesbrough goalkeeper.
 6 September 2017: José Enrique, 31, former Newcastle United and Liverpool left back.
 9 September 2017: Eiður Guðjohnsen, 38, former Iceland, Bolton Wanderers, Chelsea and Stoke City forward.
 28 September 2017: Kevin Doyle, 34, former Republic of Ireland, Reading and Wolverhampton Wanderers striker.
2 October 2017: Damian Scannell, 32, former Southend United, Dagenham & Redbridge, Eastleigh and Sutton United midfielder.
 2 October 2017: Rickie Lambert, 35, former England, Blackpool, Macclesfield Town, Stockport County, Rochdale, Bristol Rovers, Southampton, Liverpool, West Bromwich Albion and Cardiff City striker.
 30 October 2017: Kaspars Gorkšs, 35, former Blackpool, Queens Park Rangers, Reading, Wolverhampton Wanderers and Colchester United defender.
7 November 2017: Tommy Lee, 31, former Chesterfield, Macclesfield Town and Rochdale goalkeeper.
19 November 2017: Rory Fallon, 35, former New Zealand, Barnsley, Swindon Town, Swansea City, Plymouth Argyle, Yeovil Town, Crawley Town, Scunthorpe United, Bristol Rovers, Torquay United, Truro City and Dorchester Town striker.
21 November 2017: Kenwyne Jones, 33, former Trinidad and Tobago, Southampton, Sheffield Wednesday, Stoke City, Sunderland, Cardiff City and AFC Bournemouth striker.
22 November 2017: Yakubu, 35, former Nigeria, Portsmouth, Middlesbrough, Everton, Leicester City, Blackburn Rovers, Reading and Coventry City striker.
23 November 2017: Christian Ribeiro, 27, former Wales, Bristol City, Scunthorpe United, Exeter City and Oxford United defender.
20 December 2017: Tomáš Rosický, 37, former Czech Republic and Arsenal midfielder.
 5 January 2018: Johan Elmander, 36, former Sweden and Bolton Wanderers striker.
 8 February 2018: Matty Fryatt, 31, former Walsall, Leicester City, Hull City and Nottingham Forest striker.
13 February 2018: Ryan Mason, 26, former England, Tottenham Hotspur, Yeovil Town, Doncaster Rovers, Millwall, Swindon Town and Hull City midfielder.
 14 February 2018: Jamie Slabber, 33, former Tottenham Hotspur and Swindon Town forward.
 3 March 2018: Damon Lathrope, 28, former Torquay United, Aldershot Town and Woking midfielder.
 27 March 2018: Adam Yates, 34, former Port Vale, Leek Town and Morecambe defender.
 18 April 2018: Brian Lenihan, 23, former Hull City defender.
 28 April 2018: Chris Cohen, 31, former West Ham United, Yeovil Town and Nottingham Forest defender/midfielder.
 5 May 2018: Stephen Warnock, 36, former England, Liverpool, Blackburn Rovers, Aston Villa, Leeds United, Derby County, Wigan Athletic and Burton Albion left back.
 6 May 2018: Paul Robinson, 39, former Watford, West Bromwich Albion, Bolton Wanderers and Birmingham City defender.
 9 May 2018: Simon Church, 29, former Reading, Crewe Alexandra, Yeovil Town, Wycombe Wanderers, Huddersfield Town, Charlton Athletic, Milton Keynes Dons, Scunthorpe United, Plymouth Argyle and Wales forward.
 9 May 2018: Shaun Barker, 35, former Rotherham United, Blackpool, Derby County and Burton Albion defender.
 11 May 2018: Leon Britton, 35, former Swansea City and Sheffield United midfielder.
 14 May 2018: Dean Whitehead, 36, former Oxford United, Sunderland, Stoke City, Middlesbrough and Huddersfield Town midfielder.
 18 May 2018: Clint Hill, 39, former Tranmere Rovers, Oldham Athletic, Stoke City, Crystal Palace, Queens Park Rangers, Nottingham Forest and Carlisle United defender.
 24 May 2018: Lloyd Macklin, 26, former Swindon Town and Torquay United attacking midfielder.
 25 May 2018: Rhoys Wiggins, 30, former Crystal Palace, AFC Bournemouth, Norwich City, Charlton Athletic, Sheffield Wednesday and Birmingham City defender.

Notes

References